Shine On is the eighth studio album by Canadian singer-songwriter Sarah McLachlan, released on 6 May 2014 by Verve Records. It was recorded in Vancouver and produced by longtime collaborator Pierre Marchand. According to McLachlan, the album was inspired by her father's passing and her own appreciation of life.

Shine On received mostly positive reviews from music critics and became her fourth album to reach number one on the Canadian Albums Chart. It also reached number four on the US Billboard 200.

Background
Three years since her last release, Laws of Illusion, McLachlan began production of the new album with her longtime collaborator/producer, Pierre Marchand. Unlike its predecessor, which dissected the dissolution of her marriage, Shine On eases up on the heartbreak and lets McLachlan show an earthier side. “I needed to challenge myself a lot,” she said. “I needed to step outside my comfort zone. For that reason, I made an effort to write with people I hadn't written with before and to try different producers, like Bob Rock, to take some of the songs in a different direction."

In addition to experiment new sounds, McLachlan also changed things on the lyrical front: “I wanted to tell a new story. I was feeling more hopeful, more positive and light and open, and I wanted to mirror that.”

Songs such as "Surrender and Certainty" and "Song for My Father" were inspired on McLachlan's father passing away in December 2010.

Track listing

Charts

Weekly charts

Year-end charts

Certifications and sales

Credits
Kharen Hill - photography for album artwork and publicity

References

2014 albums
Sarah McLachlan albums
Albums produced by Pierre Marchand
albums produced by Bob Rock
Verve Records albums
Juno Award for Adult Contemporary Album of the Year albums